The Canadian Officers' Training Corps (COTC) was, from 1912 to 1968, Canada's university officer training programme, fashioned after the University Officers' Training Corps (UOTC) in the United Kingdom.  In World War Two the Canadian Army was able to produce quality officers due to the high standards of the COTC.

The programme also existed in French-speaking universities, some technical and classical colleges, and was known as «Corps-écoles des officiers canadiens» (CÉOC). Early in the Second World War, the COTC/CÉOC became compulsory for students, except for those holding important positions in the war effort, and those excused for health reasons. Soon after the end of hostilities, the programme reverted to its peacetime volunteer basis. In 1968 it was abolished, primarily for budgetary reasons but also due to low interest on the part of students at the time, and was replaced by an alternate programme managed through local militia units. A 2010 documentary featured the history and benefits of the COTC, during a campaign aimed at bringing it, or a similar programme, back on Canadian campuses.

Complete list of COTC Units
 CÉOC de l'Université de Montréal
 CÉOC de l'Université Laval
 CÉOC de l'Université d'Ottawa
 CÉOC de l'Université de Sherbrooke
 CÉOC de l'Université Sainte-Anne
 CÉOC de l'Université du Sacré-Coeur
 CÉOC de l'Université Saint-Joseph
 CÉOC du Collège Mont-Saint-Louis
 CÉOC du Collège Jean-de-Brébeuf
 Acadia University COTC
 Bishop's College/University COTC
 Carleton College/University COTC 1949
 Dalhousie University/King's College COTC
 Loyola College COTC
 Nova Scotia Technical College COTC
 McGill University COTC 1912
 McMaster University COTC
 Mount Allison University COTC
 Ontario Agricultural College COTC
 Ontario Veterinary College COTC
 Queen's University COTC
 Ryerson University COTC
 Sir George Williams College/University COTC
 St. Dunstan's College COTC
 St. Francis Xavier University COTC
 St. Mary's University COTC
 St. Thomas College COTC
 University of Alberta COTC
 University of British Columbia COTC
 University of Manitoba COTC 1914
 University of New Brunswick COTC
 University of Saskatchewan COTC
 University of Toronto COTC 1914
 University of Western Ontario COTC
 Wilfrid Laurier University COTC

Notable members
 Harry Crerar (1888 – 1965), General of the Canadian Army and field commander in World War II
 W. G. Hardy (1895 – 1979), Professor, author, president of the International Ice Hockey Federation
 Pierre Trudeau (1919 - 2000), Lawyer, academic and prime minister of Canada
 Pierre Bourgault (1934 - 2003), Québec politician and essayist, as well as actor and journalist
 Jean-Paul L'Allier (1938 - 2016), Québec politician, Mayor of Québec City
 Jacques Ferron (1921 - 1985), Canadian physician and author
 Jean Lesage (1912 - 1980), Québec premier, Federal cabinet minister, lawyer
 Michel Chartrand (1916 - 2010), Canadian trade union leader from Québec, Trappist monk
 Jacques Godbout (1933 -     ), Canadian novelist, essayist, children's writer, journalist, filmmaker and poet
 Victor Goldbloom (1923 - 2016), Canadian pediatrician, lecturer, and politician
 Lewis MacKenzie (1940 -     ),  General in the Canadian Army
 Charles Belzile (1933 -     ),  General in the Canadian Army
 Peter C. Newman (1929 -     ),  Canadian journalist
 Ed Broadbent (1936 -     ), Canadian politician, leader of the New Democratic Party
 Pierre Berton (1920–2004), Canadian journalist, writer and television personality

References 

Military education and training in Canada